Pronto Emergenza is an Italian television series.

See also
List of Italian television series

External links
 

Italian television series